The Valea spre Șardu is a right tributary of the river Niraj in Romania. It flows into the Niraj in Gălești.

References

Rivers of Romania
Rivers of Mureș County